The Second Temple, later known as Herod's Temple, was the reconstructed Temple in Jerusalem between  and 70 CE. Construction on the Second Temple began some time after the Neo-Babylonian Empire was conquered by the Achaemenid Persian Empire; it followed a proclamation by Persian king Cyrus the Great (see Edict of Cyrus) that ended the Babylonian captivity and initiated the return to Zion. In Jewish history, the Second Temple's completion in Persian Judah marks the beginning of the Second Temple period.

According to the Bible, the Second Temple was originally a relatively modest structure built by Jews who had returned from exile in Babylon under the authority of Persian-appointed governor Zerubbabel, the grandson of penultimate Judahite king Jeconiah. However, during the reign of Herod the Great over the Herodian Kingdom of Judea, it was completely refurbished; the original structure was overhauled into the large edifices and façades that are more recognized in modern recreated models. 

After standing for approximately 586 years, the Second Temple was destroyed by the Roman Empire during the Roman siege of Jerusalem in 70 CE.

Biblical narrative

The accession of Cyrus the Great of the Achaemenid Empire in 559 BCE made the re-establishment of the city of Jerusalem and the rebuilding of the Temple possible. Some rudimentary ritual sacrifice had continued at the site of the first temple following its destruction. According to the closing verses of the second book of Chronicles and the books of Ezra and Nehemiah, when the Jewish exiles returned to Jerusalem following a decree from Cyrus the Great (Ezra 1:1–4, 2 Chronicles 36:22-23), construction started at the original site of the altar of Solomon's Temple. These events represent the final section in the historical narrative of the Hebrew Bible.

The original core of the book of Nehemiah, the first-person memoir, may have been combined with the core of the Book of Ezra around 400 BCE. Further editing probably continued into the Hellenistic era. 

Based on the biblical account, after the return from Babylonian captivity, arrangements were immediately made to reorganize the desolated Yehud Province after the demise of the Kingdom of Judah seventy years earlier. The body of pilgrims, forming a band of 42,360, having completed the long and dreary journey of some four months, from the banks of the Euphrates to Jerusalem, were animated in all their proceedings by a strong religious impulse, and therefore one of their first concerns was to restore their ancient house of worship by rebuilding their destroyed Temple.

On the invitation of Zerubbabel, the governor, who showed them a remarkable example of liberality by contributing personally 1,000 golden darics, besides other gifts, the people poured their gifts into the sacred treasury with great enthusiasm. First they erected and dedicated the altar of God on the exact spot where it had formerly stood, and they then cleared away the charred heaps of debris that occupied the site of the old temple; and in the second month of the second year (535 BCE), amid great public excitement and rejoicing, the foundations of the Second Temple were laid. A wide interest was felt in this great movement, although it was regarded with mixed feelings by the spectators.

The Samaritans wanted to help with this work but Zerubbabel and the elders declined such cooperation, feeling that the Jews must build the Temple unaided. Immediately evil reports were spread regarding the Jews. According to Ezra 4:5, the Samaritans sought to "frustrate their purpose" and sent messengers to Ecbatana and Susa, with the result that the work was suspended.

Seven years later, Cyrus the Great, who allowed the Jews to return to their homeland and rebuild the Temple, died, and was succeeded by his son Cambyses. On his death, the "false Smerdis", an impostor, occupied the throne for some seven or eight months, and then Darius became king (522 BCE). In the second year of his rule the work of rebuilding the temple was resumed and carried forward to its completion, under the stimulus of the earnest counsels and admonitions of the prophets Haggai and Zechariah. It was ready for consecration in the spring of 516 BCE, more than twenty years after the return from captivity. The Temple was completed on the third day of the month Adar, in the sixth year of the reign of Darius, amid great rejoicings on the part of all the people, although it was evident that the Jews were no longer an independent people, but were subject to a foreign power. The Book of Haggai includes a prediction that the glory of the Second Temple would be greater than that of the first.  While the Temple may well have been consecrated in 516, construction and expansion may have continued as late as 500 BCE.

Some of the original artifacts from the Temple of Solomon are not mentioned in the sources after its destruction in 586 BCE, and are presumed lost. The Second Temple lacked the following holy articles:
 The Ark of the Covenant containing the Tablets of Stone, before which were placed the pot of manna and Aaron's rod
 The Urim and Thummim (divination objects contained in the )
 The holy oil
 The sacred fire

In the Second Temple, the Holy of Holies was separated by curtains rather than a wall as in the First Temple. Still, as in the Tabernacle, the Second Temple included:
 The Menorah (golden lamp) for the 
 The Table of Showbread
 The golden altar of incense, with golden censers

According to the Mishnah, the "Foundation Stone" stood where the Ark used to be, and the High Priest put his censer on it on Yom Kippur.

The Second Temple also included many of the original vessels of gold that had been taken by the Babylonians but restored by Cyrus the Great.

Rabbinical literature

Traditional rabbinic literature states that the Second Temple stood for 420 years, and, based on the 2nd-century work , placed construction in 356 BCE (3824 AM), 164 years later than academic estimates, and destruction in 68 CE (3828 AM).

The fifth order, or division, of the Mishnah, known as Kodashim, provides detailed descriptions and discussions of the religious laws connected with Temple service including the sacrifices, the Temple and its furnishings, as well as the priests who carried out the duties and ceremonies of its service. Tractates of the order deal with the sacrifices of animals, birds, and meal offerings, the laws of bringing a sacrifice, such as the sin offering and the guilt offering, and the laws of misappropriation of sacred property. In addition, the order contains a description of the Second Temple (tractate Middot), and a description and rules about the daily sacrifice service in the Temple (tractate Tamid).

Rededication by the Maccabees
Following the conquest of Judea by Alexander the Great, it became part of the Ptolemaic Kingdom of Egypt until 200 BCE, when the Seleucid king Antiochus III the Great of Syria defeated Pharaoh Ptolemy V Epiphanes at the Battle of Paneion.

In 167 BCE, Antiochus IV Epiphanes ordered an altar to Zeus erected in the Temple. He also, according to Josephus, "compelled Jews to dissolve the laws of the country, to keep their infants un-circumcised, and to sacrifice swine's flesh upon the altar; against which they all opposed themselves, and the most approved among them were put to death." Following the Maccabean Revolt against the Seleucid empire, the Second Temple was rededicated and became the religious pillar of the Jewish Hasmonean Kingdom, as well as culturally associated with the Jewish holiday of Hanukkah.

Hasmonean dynasty and Roman conquest
There is some evidence from archaeology that further changes to the structure of the Temple and its surroundings were made during the Hasmonean rule. Salome Alexandra, the queen of the Hasmonean Kingdom appointed her elder son Hyrcanus II as the high priest of Judaea. Her younger son Aristobulus II was determined to have the throne, and as soon as she died he seized the throne. Hyrcanus, who was next in the succession, agreed to be content with being high priest. Antipater, the governor of Idumæa, encouraged Hyrcanus not to give up his throne. Eventually, Hyrcanus fled to Aretas III, king of the Nabateans, and returned with an army to take back the throne. He defeated Aristobulus and besieged Jerusalem. The Roman general Pompey, who was in Syria fighting against the Armenians in the Third Mithridatic War, sent his lieutenant to investigate the conflict in Judaea. Both Hyrcanus and Aristobulus appealed to him for support. Pompey was not diligent in making a decision about this, which caused Aristobulus to march off. He was pursued by Pompey and surrendered but his followers closed Jerusalem to Pompey's forces. The Romans besieged and took the city in 63 BCE. The priests continued with the religious practices inside the Temple during the siege. The temple was not looted or harmed by the Romans. Pompey himself, perhaps inadvertently, went into the Holy of Holies and the next day ordered the priests to repurify the Temple and resume the religious practices.

Herod's Temple

Temenos expansion, date and duration
Reconstruction of the temple under Herod began with a massive expansion of the Temple Mount temenos. Herod's work on the Temple is generally dated from 20/19 BCE until 12/11 or 10 BCE. Writer Bieke Mahieu dates the work on the Temple enclosures from 25 BCE and that on the Temple building in 19 BCE, and situates the dedication of both in November 18 BCE.

Religious worship and temple rituals continued during the construction process. An agreement was made between Herod and the Jewish religious authorities: the sacrificial rituals, called  (offerings), were to be continued unabated for the entire time of construction, and the Temple itself would be constructed by the priests. This is the reason Herod's Temple is still counted as the Second — functioning did not stop, although it was the third building fulfilling the purpose.

Extent and financing
The old temple built by Zerubbabel was replaced by a magnificent edifice. Herod's Temple was one of the larger construction projects of the 1st century BCE. Josephus records that Herod was interested in perpetuating his name through building projects, that his construction programs were extensive and paid for by heavy taxes, but that his masterpiece was the Temple of Jerusalem.

Later, the sanctuary shekel was reinstituted to support the temple as the temple tax.

Elements

Platform, substructures, retaining walls
Mt. Moriah had a plateau at the northern end, and steeply declined on the southern slope. It was Herod's plan that the entire mountain be turned into a giant square platform. To complete it, a trench was dug around the mountain, and huge stone "bricks" were laid.

King Herod had architects from Greece, Rome and Egypt plan the construction. The blocks were presumably quarried by using pickaxes to create channels. Then they hammered in wooden beams and flushed them with water to force them out. Once they were removed, they were carved into precise squares and numbered at the quarry to show where they would be installed. The final carving would have been done by using harder stones to grind or chisel them to create precise joints. They would have been transported using oxen and specialized carts. Since the quarry was uphill from the temple they had gravity on their side but care needed to be taken to control the descent. Final installation would have been done using pulleys or cranes. Roman pulleys and cranes were not strong enough to lift the blocks alone so they may have used multiple cranes and levers to position them.

The project began with the building of giant underground vaults upon which the temple would be built so it could be larger than the small flat area on top of Mount Moriah. Legend has it that the construction of the entire complex lasted only three years, but written sources such as Josephus say that it took far longer, although the Temple itself may only have taken that long. During a Passover visit by Jesus, he was told that it had been under construction for 46 years.

Court of the Gentiles
The Court of the Gentiles was primarily a bazaar, with vendors selling souvenirs, sacrificial animals, food. Currency was also exchanged, with Roman currency exchanged for Tyrian money, as also mentioned in the New Testament account of Jesus and the Money Changers, when Jerusalem was packed with Jewish pilgrims who had come for Passover, perhaps numbering 300,000 to 400,000.

Above the Huldah Gates, on top the Temple walls, was the Royal Stoa, a large basilica praised by Josephus as "more worthy of mention than any other [structure] under the sun"; its main part was a lengthy Hall of Columns which includes 162 columns, structured in four rows.

The Royal Stoa is widely accepted to be part of Herod's work; however, recent archaeological finds in the Western Wall tunnels suggest that it was built in the first century during the reign of Agripas, as opposed to the 1st century BCE.

Pinnacle
The accounts of the temptation of Christ in the gospels of Matthew and Luke both suggest that the Second Temple had one or more 'pinnacles':

According to Strong's Concordance, it can mean little wing, or by extension anything like a wing such as a battlement or parapet. The archaeologist Benjamin Mazar thought it referred to the southeast corner of the Temple overlooking the Kidron Valley.

Inner courts
According to Josephus, there were ten entrances into the inner courts, four on the south, four on the north, one on the east and one leading east to west from the Court of Women to the court of the Israelites, named the Nicanor Gate. According to Josephus, Herod the Great erected a golden eagle over the great gate of the Temple.

Pilgrimages

Jews from distant parts of the Roman Empire would arrive by boat at the port of Jaffa, where they would join a caravan for the three-day trek to the Holy City and would then find lodgings in one of the many hotels or hostelries. Then they changed some of their money from the profane standard Greek and Roman currency for Jewish and Tyrian money, the latter two considered religious.

Destruction

In 66 CE the Jewish population rebelled against the Roman Empire. Four years later, on 4 August 70 CE (the 9th day of Av and possibly the day on which Tisha B'Av was observed) or 30 August 70 CE, Roman legions under Titus retook and destroyed much of Jerusalem and the Second Temple. The Arch of Titus, which was built in Rome to commemorate Titus's victory in Judea, depicts a Roman victory procession with soldiers carrying spoils from the Temple, including the Menorah. According to an inscription on the Colosseum, Emperor Vespasian built the Colosseum with war spoils in 79 CE – possibly from the spoils of the Second Temple.

The sects of Judaism that had their base in the Temple dwindled in importance, including the priesthood and the Sadducees.

The Temple was on the site of what today is the Dome of the Rock. The gates led out close to Al-Aqsa Mosque (which came much later). Although Jews continued to inhabit the destroyed city, Emperor Hadrian established a new city called Aelia Capitolina. At the end of the Bar Kokhba revolt in 135 CE, many of the Jewish communities were massacred and Jews were banned from living inside Jerusalem. A pagan Roman temple was set up on the former site of Herod's Temple.

Historical accounts relate that not only the Jewish Temple was destroyed, but also the entire Lower city of Jerusalem. Even so, according to Josephus, Titus did not totally raze the towers (such as the Tower of Phasael, now erroneously called the Tower of David), keeping them as a memorial of the city's strength. The Midrash Rabba (Eikha Rabba 1:32) recounts a similar episode related to the destruction of the city, according to which Rabban Yohanan ben Zakkai, during the Roman siege of Jerusalem, requested of Vespasian that he spare the westernmost gates of the city that lead to Lydda (Lod). When the city was eventually taken, the Arab auxiliaries who had fought alongside the Romans under their general, Fanjar, also spared that westernmost wall from destruction.

Jewish eschatology includes a belief that the Second Temple will be replaced by a future Third Temple in Jerusalem; Eastern Orthodox Christians contend that the Third Temple already exists in every consecrated and canonical church through the real presence of Christ in the Eucharist.

Archaeology

Temple warning inscriptions
The stone inscription outlined the prohibition extended unto those who were not of the Jewish nation to proceed beyond the  separating the larger Court of the Gentiles and the inner courts. The inscription read in seven lines:

Today, the stone is preserved in 
Istanbul's Museum of Antiquities.

In 1935 a fragment of another similar Temple warning inscription was found.

Place of trumpeting
Another ancient inscription, partially preserved on a stone discovered below the southwest corner of the Herodian Mount, contains the words "to the place of trumpeting...". The stone's shape suggests that it was part of a parapet, and it has been interpreted as belonging to a spot on the Mount described by Josephus, "where one of the priests to stand and to give notice, by sound of trumpet, in the afternoon of the approach, and on the following evening of the close, of every seventh day..." closely resembling what the Talmud says.

Walls and gates of the Temple complex
After 1967, archaeologists found that the wall extended all the way around the Temple Mount and is part of the city wall near the Lions' Gate. Thus, the Western Wall is not the only remaining part of the Temple Mount. Currently, Robinson's Arch (named after American Edward Robinson) remains as the beginning of an arch that spanned the gap between the top of the platform and the higher ground farther away. Visitors and pilgrims also entered through the still-extant, but now plugged, gates on the southern side that led through colonnades to the top of the platform. The Southern wall was designed as a grand entrance. Recent archaeological digs have found numerous  (ritual baths) for the ritual purification of the worshipers, and a grand stairway leading to one of the now blocked entrances.

Underground structures
Inside the walls, the platform was supported by a series of vaulted archways, now called Solomon's Stables, which still exist.

Quarry
On September 25, 2007, Yuval Baruch, archaeologist with the Israeli Antiquities Authority announced the discovery of a quarry compound that may have provided King Herod with the stones to build his Temple on the Temple Mount. Coins, pottery and an iron stake found proved the date of the quarrying to be about 19 BCE. Archaeologist Ehud Netzer confirmed that the large outlines of the stone cuts is evidence that it was a massive public project worked by hundreds of slaves.

Floor tiling from courts
More recent findings from the Temple Mount Sifting Project include floor tiling from the Second Temple period.

Magdala stone interpretation
The Magdala stone is thought to be a representation of the Second Temple carved before its destruction in the year 70.

Gallery

Second Temple Judaism

The period between the construction of the Second Temple in 515 BCE and its destruction by the Romans in 70 CE witnessed major historical upheavals and significant religious changes that would affect most subsequent Abrahamic religions. The origins of the authority of scripture, of the centrality of law and morality in religion, of the synagogue and of apocalyptic expectations for the future all developed in the Judaism of this period.

See also
 Archaeological remnants of the Jerusalem Temple
 Herodian architecture
 Jerusalem stone
 List of artifacts significant to the Bible
 List of megalithic sites
 Replicas of the Jewish Temple
 Temple of Peace, Rome
 Temple in Jerusalem
 Timeline of Jewish history

Notes

References

Further reading

 Grabbe, Lester. 2008. A History of the Jews and Judaism in the Second Temple Period. 2 vols. New York: T&T Clark.
 Nickelsburg, George. 2005. Jewish Literature between the Bible and the Mishnah: A Historical and Literary Introduction. 2nd ed. Minneapolis: Fortress.
 Schiffman, Lawrence, ed. 1998. Texts and Traditions: A Source Reader for the Study of Second Temple and Rabbinic Judaism. Hoboken, NJ: KTAV.
 Stone, Michael, ed. 1984. The Literature of the Jewish People in the Period of the Second Temple and the Talmud. 2 vols. Philadelphia: Fortress.

External links

 Second Temple and Talmudic Era The Jewish History Resource Center, Project of the Dinur Center for Research in Jewish History, The Hebrew University of Jerusalem
 Jewish Encyclopedia: Temple of Herod
 Jewish Encyclopedia: Temple, The Second
 4 Enoch: The Online Encyclopedia of Second Temple Judaism
 Second Temple of Jerusalem (renders album of 3d model) / Zonerama photo gallery
 Jerusalem Videos The Southern & Western walls in Jerusalem – The Temple Mount
 Temple Mount Photos The Temple Mount photos including sites below the Mount itself, off limits to any non-Muslims
 PBS Frontline: Temple Culture
 Picture gallery of a model of the temple

 
1871 archaeological discoveries
1st-century BC religious buildings and structures
1st-century disestablishments
515 BC
6th-century BC establishments
6th-century BC religious buildings and structures
70 disestablishments
70s disestablishments in the Roman Empire
Ancient Hebrew pilgrimage sites
Ancient Jewish Greek history
Ancient Jewish Persian history
Buildings and structures demolished in the 1st century
Classical sites in Jerusalem
Cyrus the Great
Darius the Great
Destroyed temples
Ezra–Nehemiah
Herod the Great
Maccabean Revolt
Jewish Persian and Iranian history
Jews and Judaism in the Roman Republic and the Roman Empire
Religion in ancient Israel and Judah